Haribhau Upadhyaya was an Indian politician and an Indian independence activist. He was the Chief Minister of Ajmer state from 1952 to 1956.

Life
He was born in 1892 at Bhaurasa village in present-day Dewas of Madhya Pradesh. In 1952, he was elected to the Ajmer Legislative Assembly from Shrinagar constituency as an Indian National Congress candidate and became the Chief Minister of Ajmer state from 24 March 1952 to 31 October 1956. He was elected to the Rajasthan Legislative Assembly in 1957 from Kekri constituency and served as the Finance minister in Rajasthan government from 1957 to 1962. He was re-elected to the Rajasthan Legislative Assembly from the same constituency and served as the Education Minister in Rajasthan government from 1962 to 1967. He was awarded Padma Bhushan in 1966. He died on 25 August 1972.

Works
 Swatantrta Ki Aur (स्वतंत्रता की ओर) (in Hindi)
 Durvadal (दूर्वादल) (in Hindi)
 Yug Dharm (युगधर्म) (in Hindi)
 Bapu ke Ashram Mey (बापू के आश्रम में) (in Hindi)
 Sadhana ke Path Par (साधना के पथ पर) (in Hindi)

References

Rajasthani politicians
Indian independence activists from Rajasthan
Recipients of the Padma Bhushan in literature & education
1892 births
1972 deaths
People from Ajmer district
People from Ujjain district
Rajasthan MLAs 1957–1962
Rajasthan MLAs 1962–1967
Chief ministers from Indian National Congress
Indian National Congress politicians from Rajasthan